The 2009 Melbourne Storm season was the 12th in the club's history. They competed in the NRL's 2009 Telstra Premiership and finished the regular season 4th out of 16 teams. They then progressed to their fourth consecutive grand final, this time to be played against the Parramatta Eels and won, claiming their second premiership in three seasons, a title later stripped in 2010 after being found guilty of salary cap breaches.

A slow start to the season saw Melbourne win just three of their first seven games. However the team rallied, losing just one of their next seven to move into fourth position by Round 14, where they would remain for the rest of the season. The finals series was when Melbourne really hit their straps, winning their first two finals by 28 and 30 points respectively. In the Grand Final, Storm defeated Parramatta 23–16 with Billy Slater named the Clive Churchill Medalist.

Melbourne played all their regular season home games at Olympic Park, the final season playing at the venue before moving to the new Melbourne Rectangular Stadium the following season.

Season summary 
 Round 1 – A field goal in the fourth minute of golden point extra time by Greg Inglis gives Melbourne a thrilling 17–16 win over St George Illawarra Dragons in the 2009 season opening game at Olympic Park. The game was the first played under the NRL's dual-referee system.
 Round 2 – A try by former Storm player Israel Folau and a highly controversial try by Peter Wallace hands Brisbane Broncos a 16–14 win over Melbourne at Suncorp Stadium. It is the Broncos first win over Melbourne since the 2006 NRL Grand Final.
 14 April – After being informed that he was not fit into their long-term plans, Parramatta Eels'  Brett Finch signs with Melbourne, joining the club for the remainder of the 2009 season.
 Round 7 – Hosting a match on ANZAC Day for just the second time, Melbourne drew 14–14 against New Zealand Warriors in wet and slippery conditions at Olympic Park. Warriors  Lance Hohaia looked to have broken the deadlock with less than a minute left in golden point extra time, before the video referee disallowed his successful field goal attempt due to a knock-on in the lead up from Stacey Jones. The drawn result was the club's first since the institution of golden point in 2003.
 Round 8 – Melbourne exact a small amount of revenge on Manly with a 22–8 win at Brookvale Oval in their first rematch since the 2008 NRL Grand Final.
 Round 9 – With eight players backing up from the midseason test only three nights earlier, regular captain Cameron Smith starts from the bench, with Cooper Cronk taking over as acting captain. Melbourne defeat Sydney Roosters 28–12 in front of a small crowd at Gosford.
 13 May – Part-time specialist coach Matthew Johns indefinitely parted ways with the club following his involvement in a sex scandal.
 Round 10 – Melbourne claim their 14th-straight win over Canberra Raiders, winning 46–6, their greatest winning margin over the Raiders.
 Round 13 – Two days after the opening State of Origin match, Melbourne thrash Brisbane 48–4 at Olympic Park, with Joe Tomane scoring 24 points (three tries, six goals).
 Round 14 – Melbourne returned to Perth for the first time since 1999, defeating South Sydney Rabbitohs 28–22 at Members Equity Stadium.
 Round 15 – Dane Nielsen becomes the first player sent off for the season, after a high tackle on Wests Tigers er Beau Ryan. With only a few minutes remaining after Nielsen's dismissal, Melbourne hold on to win 14–12.
 Round 16 – Canberra defeat Melbourne 26–16 at Canberra Stadium, to win their first game against Storm since 2002.
 30 July – Brett Finch signs a one-year deal to stay with Melbourne in 2010.
 7 August – Melbourne announce that they will end their feeder club arrangement with Central Coast Storm and establish their own team in the NSW Cup in 2010.
 10 August – Greg Inglis is charged by police for assaulting his girlfriend Sally Robinson. He is immediately stood-down by Melbourne, with club sponsor ME Bank reportedly reviewing their position with the club.
 27 August – The Melbourne Storm board allow Greg Inglis to resume playing, despite still facing assault charges.
 Round 25 – In the club's last game at Olympic Park, the return of Greg Inglis sparked Melbourne to a 38–4 win over Sydney Roosters, ending a two-game losing streak. Melbourne finish with 104 wins from 136 games at Olympic Park, an imposing 76.5 winning percentage.
 Round 26 – Melbourne book a top-four finish, with an impressive 30–0 win over New Zealand Warriors to regain the Michael Moore Trophy.
 Qualifying Final – Returning to Etihad Stadium, Melbourne thrash Manly 40-12 led by four tries from Billy Slater. The win, coupled with upsets in the other qualifying finals earns Melbourne a week off and a preliminary final in Melbourne.
 Preliminary Final – Held on the night of the 2009 AFL Grand Final, a crowd of 27,687 watches Melbourne demolish Brisbane 40–10 to make their fourth successive Grand Final. A hat-trick of tries to Greg Inglis helping Melbourne end Brisbane's season in disappointment for the third year in a row.
 Grand Final – Melbourne Storm win their 3rd Grand Final in their 11-year history, beating the Parramatta Eels 23–16 at ANZ Stadium in front of crowd of 82,538.  Billy Slater is awarded the Clive Churchill Medal, as Melbourne lead all night withstanding a late Parramatta comeback.
 12 November – Salary cap pressure forces Melbourne to bid farewell to Dallas Johnson who subsequently signs with Catalans Dragons on a three-year deal.

Milestone games

Jerseys
New apparel supplier KooGa kept the same home and clash jersey design as worn in 2008. ME Bank replaced Medibank as the main jersey advertiser, with all other advertisers continuing their sponsorships from 2008.

In Round 10 against Canberra, Melbourne wore a heritage jersey based on the design of the 2001-02 clash jersey, featuring purple with silver thunderbolts. This would be the first time the club had worn an away or clash jersey at Olympic Park.

Fixtures

Pre season

Regular season
Source:
(GP) – Golden Point extra time
(pen) – Penalty try

Finals

Ladder

2009 Coaching Staff
 Head coach: Craig Bellamy
 Assistant coaches: Michael Maguire & Stephen Kearney
 Development coach: Tony Adam
 Strength and conditioning Coach: Alex Corvo
 Football Manager: Frank Ponissi
 NRL Under 20s Coach: Brad Arthur
 Feeder Club Coach: Jamie Feeney (Central Coast Storm)

2009 squad
List current as of 3 May 2022

2009 NRL Grand Final Winning Team

Player movements

Losses
 Russell Aitken to AS Carcassonne
 Michael Crocker to Hull F.C.→South Sydney Rabbitohs
 Israel Folau to Brisbane Broncos
 Liam Foran to New Zealand Warriors
 Matt Geyer to Retirement
 Antonio Kaufusi to North Queensland Cowboys
 Clifford Manua to Released
 Jeremy Smith to St George Illawarra Dragons
 Sam Tagataese to Gold Coast Titans

Gains
 Matthew Cross from Gold Coast Titans
 Brett Finch from Parramatta Eels (midseason)
 Ryan Hinchcliffe from Canberra Raiders
 Willie Isa from Penrith Panthers
 Wairangi Koopu from New Zealand Warriors
 James Maloney from Parramatta Eels
 Ryan Tandy from Wests Tigers

Representative honours
This table lists all players who have played a representative match in 2009.

Statistics
This table contains playing statistics for all Melbourne Storm players to have played in the 2009 NRL season.

Statistics sources:

Scorers

Most points in a game: 24 points
 Round 13 – Joe Tomane (3 tries, 6 goals) vs Brisbane Broncos

Most tries in a game: 4 
 Qualifying Final – Billy Slater vs Manly Warringah Sea Eagles

Winning games

Highest score in a winning game: 48 points 
 Round 13 vs Brisbane Broncos

Lowest score in a winning game: 14 points
 Round 15 vs Wests Tigers

Greatest winning margin: 42 points 
 Round 13 vs Brisbane Broncos

Greatest number of games won consecutively: 5
 Round 25 – Grand Final

Losing games

Highest score in a losing game: 16 points
 Round 16 vs Canberra Raiders
 Round 19 vs Parramatta Eels
 Round 24 vs Manly Warringah Sea Eagles

Lowest score in a losing game: 6 points 
 Round 4 vs Gold Coast Titans
 Round 6 vs Wests Tigers

Greatest losing margin: 16 points
 Round 11 vs Canterbury-Bankstown Bulldogs

Greatest number of games lost consecutively: 2 
 Round 23 – Round 24

NRL Under 20s

In the second season of the NRL's National Youth Championship, Melbourne were again coached by Brad Arthur finishing the regular season in third place on the ladder to qualify for the finals.

Ladder

Finals

2009 NRL Under 20s Premiership Team

Statistics
Source:

Scorers
Most points in a game: 20 points
 Round 2 – Gareth Widdop (2 tries, 6 goals) vs Brisbane Broncos
 Round 17 – Gareth Widdop (1 try, 8 goals) vs Newcastle Knights
 Round 20 – Gareth Widdop (2 tries, 6 goals) vs Cronulla-Sutherland Sharks

Most tries in a game: 5 
 Qualifying Final – Dane Chisholm vs South Sydney Rabbitohs

Most points (season): 294
 Gareth Widdop (18 tries, 111 goals)

Most tries (season): 25
 Matt Duffie

Winning games
Highest score in a winning game: 54 points 
 Round 11 vs Canterbury-Bankstown Bulldogs
 Qualifying Final vs South Sydney Rabbitohs

Lowest score in a winning game: 16 points
 Round 25 vs Sydney Roosters

Greatest winning margin: 36 points 
 Qualifying Final vs South Sydney Rabbitohs

Greatest number of games won consecutively: 8
 Round 22 – Grand Final

Losing games
Highest score in a losing game: 34 points
 Round 16 vs Canberra Raiders

Lowest score in a losing game: 16 points 
 Round 10 vs Canberra Raiders

Greatest losing margin: 12 points
 Round 21 vs St George Illawarra Dragons

Greatest number of games lost consecutively: 2 
 Round 15 – Round 16

S. G. Ball Cup
For the first time in club history, Melbourne entered a junior representative team in the New South Wales Rugby League under-18s competition S. G. Ball Cup.

Coached by club high performance manager Kim Williams, the team finished the regular season in fourth place, winning six of their nine matches. During the finals, the team stunned more fancied rivals, defeating Illawarra 50–10, Newcastle 22–16, and Manly 28–14 to progress to the competition's Grand Final against Canterbury-Bankstown Bulldogs.

Feeder Team
For a second successive season, Melbourne sent their back-up players to play with Central Coast Storm, coached by former Storm player Jamie Feeney.

Central Coast made the finals, finishing in 2nd position (out of 11 teams), behind eventual premiers Bankstown City Bulls. Central Coast were eliminated from the NSW Cup finals after successive defeats against Western Suburbs and Balmain Ryde-Eastwood.

Awards

Trophy Cabinet
 2009 Provan-Summons Trophy
 2009 National Youth Competition Toyota Cup

Melbourne Storm Awards Night
Melbourne Storm Player of the Year: Billy Slater 
 Members' Player of the Year: Billy Slater
 Best Back: Greg Inglis
 Best Forward: Cameron Smith
 Rookie of the Year: Kevin Proctor
 Most Improved: Aiden Tolman
 Best Try: Will Chambers v Canberra Raiders (Round 16)
 Greatest Hit: Adam Blair v Manly (Round 24)
 Darren Bell U20s Player of the Year Award: Gareth Widdop
 U20s Most Improved: Jai Jones
 U20s Best Forward: Jesse Bromwich
 U20s Best Back: Luke Kelly
 Mick Moore Club Person of the Year: Troy Thomson
 Greg Brentnall Young Achievers Trophy: Lucas Grech
 Community Award: Steve Turner
 Life Member Inductee: Cameron Smith
 U18 SG Ball Player of the Year: Slade Griffin

Dally M Awards Night
Dally M Representative Player of the Year: Greg Inglis

Rugby League World Golden Boot Awarda Night
Golden Boot Award: Greg Inglis

RLPA Awards Night
RLPA Australia Representative Player of the Year: Greg Inglis

RLIF Awards
RLIF Coach of the Year: Craig Bellamy
RLIF Centre of the Year: Greg Inglis
RLIF Hooker of the Year: Cameron Smith

Additional Awards
Clive Churchill Medal: Billy Slater
 Wally Lewis Medal: Greg Inglis
 QRL Ron McAuliffe Medal: Greg Inglis
Rugby League Four Nations Player of the Series: Greg Inglis
 Jack Gibson Medal: Luke Kelly
 Sprit of ANZAC Medal: Adam Blair
 New Zealand Kiwis Player of the Year : Adam Blair

Notes

References

Melbourne Storm seasons
Melbourne Storm